LTG David Dale Halverson (born August 13, 1957) assumed the duties of the commanding general of the U.S. Army Installation Management Command and Assistant Chief of Staff for Installation Management April 8, 2014. Previously, he served as deputy commanding general/chief of staff, U.S. Army Training and Doctrine Command TRADOC. Halverson assumed duties as the Deputy Commanding General/Chief of Staff, U.S. Army Training and Doctrine Command on 4 June 2012.

Education
Born in Minnesota and raised in Babbitt, Minnesota, Halverson graduated from the United States Military Academy and was commissioned a Second Lieutenant in the Field Artillery in June 1979. He attended the U.S. Naval Postgraduate School in Monterey, California, where he was awarded a Master of Science degree in Operations Research and Systems Analysis in 1989 with a thesis entitled Enlistment Motivators for High Quality Recruits in the Army Reserve. He is a graduate of the Armed Forces Staff College, Army War College and the British Higher Command and Staff Course.

Military career

Halverson's first duty assignment was in the 1st Cavalry Division, Fort Hood, Texas in 1979 where he served as a Battalion Reconnaissance Officer, Battery Fire Direction and Executive Officer and Battalion Adjutant.  Since then, Halverson has served in various staff and leadership positions including command at every level from Battery to Post Command.  His commands include A Battery, 6th Battalion, 29th Field Artillery, 8th Infantry Division; 2nd Battalion, 82nd Field Artillery, 1st Cavalry Division; 2nd Infantry Division Artillery, Operational Test Command, and Commanding General, Fires Center of Excellence and Fort Sill.

Halverson retired from active duty on June 30, 2016.

Personal life
Halverson is a die-hard Minnesota sports fan, well known for his love of the Minnesota Vikings, Minnesota Twins and the Wild.

Promotions

Awards and decorations

Badges

Medals and ribbons

References

External links

Official U.S. Army Training and Doctrine Command Website
Lieutenant General David D. Halverson

1957 births
Living people
People from St. Louis County, Minnesota
United States Military Academy alumni
Military personnel from Minnesota
Naval Postgraduate School alumni
Joint Forces Staff College alumni
United States Army War College alumni
Graduates of Joint Services Command and Staff College
Recipients of the Legion of Merit
United States Army generals
Recipients of the Defense Superior Service Medal
Recipients of the Distinguished Service Medal (US Army)